Majd Kamalmaz is an American psychotherapist from Arlington, Virginia, who has been detained in Syria since February 2017.

His children appealed to Donald Trump for help. Kamalmaz is reported to be a diabetic.

Kamalmaz's family is a part of the Bring Our Families Home campaign which advocates to bring home wrongful detainees and hostages. Kamalmaz's image is featured in a 15-foot mural in Georgetown (Washington, D.C.) along with other Americans wrongfully detained abroad.

References

Living people
American people of Iranian descent
American psychotherapists
Psychotherapy in the United States
Prisoners and detainees of Syria
Year of birth missing (living people)